Cerca de Ti (Close to You) is the 7th album by iconic Mexican pop singer Lucía Méndez, It was released in 1982.

Track listing
All songs written by Camilo Blanes, except where noted.
 Atada a Nada
 Te Tengo en Mis Manos
 Culpable o Inocente
 Ni una Semana Más (Sergio Fachelli, Blanes)
 Escúchame
 Contigo o sin Ti
 ¿Qué Clase de Hombre Eres Tú?
 Amiga Mía
 Amo Todo de Ti
 Don't Tell My Mama (Fernando Arbex)

Singles
 Te Tengo en Mis Manos / Contigo o sin Ti
 Culpable o Inocente / ¿Qué Clase de Hombre Eres Tú?
 Atada a Nada / Amo Todo de Ti

Video Clips
 Escúchame
 Contigo o sin Ti
 ¿Qué Clase de Hombre Eres Tú?
 Culpable o Inocente

1982 albums
Lucía Méndez albums